Kadett may refer to:

 Kadett, term used in Sweden to denote officer candidates studying in order to become an officer
 Opel Kadett, small family car produced by the German automobile manufacturer Opel
 Heinkel He 72 Kadett, a German single-engine biplane trainer of the 1930s

See also  
 Kadet (disambiguation)
 Kadets (disambiguation)